The Bern Convention on the Conservation of European Wildlife and Natural Habitats, also known as the Bern Convention (or Berne Convention), is a binding international legal instrument in the field of Nature Conservation, it covers the natural heritage in Europe, as well as in some African countries.
The Convention was open for signature on 19 September 1979 and came into force on 1 June 1982.  It is particularly concerned about protecting natural habitats and endangered species, including migratory species.

Aims and objectives

The convention has three main aims, which are stated in Article 1:

 to conserve wild flora and fauna and their natural habitats
 to promote cooperation between states
 to give particular attention to endangered and vulnerable species including endangered and vulnerable migratory species

Structure

The convention is divided into:

Preamble 
Because this convention has a special nature, which is to include the maximum number of signatures possible, it included the eventual signing by non-members of the Council of Europe: "the member States of the Council of Europe and the other signatories hereto, Considering that the aim of the Council of Europe is to achieve a greater unity between its members,...”
Chapter I – General provisions
This chapter contains three articles, where it is stated the three aims of the Convention and general obligations of the Contracting Parties.
Chapter II – Protection of habitats
Here are set out the obligations of the Contracting Parties concerning the conservation of the habitats.
Chapter III – Protection of species
This chapter contains the obligations of the Contracting Parties regarding the Appendices I, II, III and IV and the exceptions of these obligations.
Chapter IV – Special provisions for migratory species
This chapter contains the obligations of the Contracting Parties regarding migratory species.
Chapter V – Supplementary provisions
This chapter contains supplementary obligations of the Contracting Parties, concerning co-operation, research, reintroduction and introduction of species.
Chapter VI – Standing Committee
This chapter settles the functioning procedure of the Standing Committee and their tasks.
Chapter VII – Amendments
This chapter contains the procedure of amendments regarding articles and Appendices of the Convention.
Chapter VIII – Settlement of disputes
This chapter contains the procedure of the arbitration of any disputes that could arise between Contracting Parties.
Chapter IX – Final provisions
This chapter contains the final arrangements of the Convention.
 Appendices
Four appendices set out particular species for protection. They are regularly updated by the Standing Committee, who are advised by a number of Expert Groups:
 Appendix I – Strictly protected flora species
 Appendix II – Strictly protected fauna species
 Appendix III – Protected fauna species
 Appendix IV – Prohibited means and methods of killing, capture and other exploitation

Ratifying states

Member States of the Council of Europe, status as of 15 February 2022.

States not members of the Council of Europe

International Organisations

Algeria, Cape Verde, the Holy See, San Marino and Russia are among non-signatories that have observer status at meetings of the committee.

The convention led to the creation in 1998 of the Emerald network of Areas of Special Conservation Interest (ASCIs) throughout the territory of the parties to the convention, which operates alongside the European Union's Natura 2000 programme.

Duties of contracting parties
All countries that have signed the convention must:

 promote national conservation policies
 promote measures against pollution
 promote educational and informative measures
 co-ordinate efforts to protect migratory species
 establish legislative and administrative measures

Monitoring the implementation of the convention
To achieve successfully the aims of this Convention, a number of monitoring devices were implemented.

Reporting system

 Compulsory biannual reports
 Voluntary general reports (every four years)
 Legal reports (one country per year)
 National reports
 Follow-up of recommendations

Groups of experts

The chosen experts are in charge of monitoring the implementation of the Standing Committee recommendation regarding species and habitats, as well as doing their own recommendations about specific conservation problems.

Case-file system

The system is based in complaints for possible non-compliance or other problems related with the provisions of the Convention. These complaints are processed by the Secretariat, the Bureau and the Standing Committee and when they feel there is the need for further information, on-the-spot visits by independent experts can be arranged.

See also
Animal rights by country or territory
Biogeographic regions of Europe
Environmental agreements
International Convention on the Protection of Birds
International Union for Conservation of Nature
List of international animal welfare conventions
Migratory Bird Treaty
Red Data Book of the Russian Federation
List of Council of Europe treaties

References

External links
Text of treaty and appendices
Natura 2000 network

Environmental treaties
Treaties concluded in 1979
Treaties entered into force in 1982
Environment of Europe
1982 in the environment
Wildlife law
1979 in Switzerland
Council of Europe treaties
Treaties of Albania
Treaties of Andorra
Treaties of Armenia
Treaties of Austria
Treaties of Azerbaijan
Treaties of Belgium
Treaties of Bosnia and Herzegovina
Treaties of Bulgaria
Treaties of Croatia
Treaties of Cyprus
Treaties of the Czech Republic
Treaties of Denmark
Treaties of Estonia
Treaties of Finland
Treaties of France
Treaties of Georgia (country)
Treaties of West Germany
Treaties of Greece
Treaties of Hungary
Treaties of Iceland
Treaties of Ireland
Treaties of Italy
Treaties of Latvia
Treaties of Liechtenstein
Treaties of Lithuania
Treaties of Luxembourg
Treaties of Malta
Treaties of Moldova
Treaties of Monaco
Treaties of Montenegro
Treaties of the Netherlands
Treaties of Norway
Treaties of Poland
Treaties of Portugal
Treaties of Romania
Treaties of Serbia
Treaties of Slovakia
Treaties of Slovenia
Treaties of Spain
Treaties of Sweden
Treaties of Switzerland
Treaties of North Macedonia
Treaties of Turkey
Treaties of Ukraine
Treaties of the United Kingdom
Treaties of Belarus
Treaties of Burkina Faso
Treaties of Morocco
Treaties of Senegal
Treaties of Tunisia
Treaties entered into by the European Union
Animal treaties
Treaties extended to Jersey